Gasoline is a Canadian quarterly rock music magazine based out of Toronto, Ontario. The magazine was first published in May 2003. It is affiliated with the bar Bovine Sex Club in Toronto and has interviewed a variety of bands and artists from all over the world. Gasoline is available in major cities across Canada.

References

External links
Gasoline

2003 establishments in Canada
Music magazines published in Canada
Magazines established in 2003
Magazines published in Toronto
Quarterly magazines published in Canada